Abrahamsen is a Scandinavian patronymic surname, which may refer to the following people:

 Hans Abrahamsen (born 1952), Danish composer
 Isak Abrahamsen (1891–1972), Norwegian gymnast
 Lars Kristian Abrahamsen (1855–1921), Norwegian politician

See also 
 Point Abrahamsen, point on the north coast of South Georgia island

References 

Danish-language surnames
Norwegian-language surnames
Patronymic surnames